Spy hunter may refer to:

Original video games
Spy Hunter, a 1983 arcade game
Spy Hunter II, a direct sequel to the 1983 original
Super Spy Hunter, a 1992 video game developed by Sunsoft originally known as Battle Formula

Remakes
SpyHunter, the 2001 video game remake by Midway Games
SpyHunter 2, a sequel to Midway Games' 2001 remake
SpyHunter: Nowhere to Run, the third game in the series
Spy Hunter (2012 video game), the latest appearance 

It may also refer to:
Spy Hunter, a song by Christian rock band Project 86
Samurai Spy (1965), a film also known as Spy Hunter
SpyHunter (software), an anti-spyware program for Microsoft Windows

Books
Michael_Shrimpton#Conspiracy theories
John Anthony Walker#Further reading